Kibande is an administrative ward in Buhigwe District  of Kigoma Region of Tanzania. In 2016 the Tanzania National Bureau of Statistics report there were 10,844 people in the ward, from 9,852 in 2012.

Villages / neighborhoods 
The ward has 2 villages and 7 hamlets.

 Kibande 
 Nyabisindu
 Kilundo
 Masekelo
 Kibande
 Bweranka 
 Mwilala
 Muvyiru
 Bweranka

References

Buhigwe District
Wards of Kigoma Region